The 2014–15 Cal State Northridge Matadors men's basketball team represented California State University, Northridge during the 2014–15 NCAA Division I men's basketball season. The Matadors, led by second year head coach Reggie Theus, played their home games at the Matadome as members of the Big West Conference. They finished the season 9–24, 4–12 in Big West play to finish in eighth place. They lost in the first round of the Big West tournament to UC Davis.

Roster

Schedule and results
Source: 

|-
!colspan=9 style="background:#231F20; color:#CD1041;"| Exhibition

|-
!colspan=9 style="background:#231F20; color:#CD1041;"| Regular season

|-
!colspan=9 style="background:#231F20; color:#CD1041;"| Big West tournament

References

Cal State Northridge Matadors men's basketball seasons
Cal State Northridge